Thomas Nicol Williamson (14 September 1936 – 16 December 2011) was a Scottish actor, once described by playwright John Osborne as "the greatest actor since Marlon Brando". He was also described by Samuel Beckett as "touched by genius" and viewed by many critics as "the Hamlet of his generation" during the late 1960s.

Early life
Thomas Nicol Williamson was born on 14 September 1936 (he would later claim 1938 in Who's Who) in Hamilton, Lanarkshire, the son of Hugh Williamson, operator of an aluminium manufacturing plant and former hairdresser's assistant, and Mary Brown Hill, née Storrie. When he was 18 months old, his family moved to Birmingham, England. Williamson was sent back to Hamilton to live with his grandparents during World War II due to Birmingham's susceptibility to bombing, but returned when the war ended, and was educated at the Central Grammar School for Boys, Birmingham. He left school at 16 to begin work in his father's factory and later attended the Birmingham School of Speech & Drama. He recalled his time there as "a disaster" and claimed "it was nothing more than a finishing school for the daughters of local businessmen".

Career

Stage and screen
After his national service as a gunner in the Airborne Division, Williamson made his professional debut with the Dundee Repertory Theatre in 1960 and the following year appeared with the Arts Theatre in Cambridge. In 1962 he made his London debut as Flute in Tony Richardson's production of A Midsummer Night's Dream at the Royal Court Theatre. His first major success came in 1964 with John Osborne's Inadmissible Evidence, for which he was nominated for a Tony Award when it transferred to Broadway the following year. In spring 1981, he and original director Anthony Page revived the play for a six-week engagement at the Roundabout Theatre (23rd Street) in New York, fifteen years after the original Broadway run.

The same year, he appeared as Vladimir in Samuel Beckett's Waiting for Godot at the Royal Court. He starred in the film version in 1968. Williamson's Hamlet for Tony Richardson at the Roundhouse caused a sensation; it was later transferred to New York and made into a film, with a cast including Anthony Hopkins and Marianne Faithfull. Faithfull later stated in her autobiography Faithfull that she and Williamson had an affair while filming Hamlet.

His most celebrated film role was as Merlin the magician in the King Arthur epic Excalibur in 1981. Director John Boorman cast him opposite Helen Mirren as Morgana over the protests of both actors; the two had previously appeared together on stage in Macbeth, with disastrous results, and they disliked each other intensely. It was Boorman's hope that the very real animosity that they had towards each other would generate more tension between them on screen. Williamson gained recognition from a much wider fanbase for his performance as Merlin. A review of Excalibur in The Times in 1981 states: "The actors are led by Williamson's witty, perceptive Merlin, missed every time he's off the screen." According to Mirren, she and Williamson, free from the problems with Macbeth, "wound up becoming very good friends" during Excalibur.

Some of his other notable cinematic performances include as a troubled Irish soldier in the 1968 Jack Gold film The Bofors Gun; in 1975 as an intelligence officer in apartheid South Africa in The Wilby Conspiracy (starring Sidney Poitier and Michael Caine); as Sherlock Holmes in the 1976 Herbert Ross film The Seven-Per-Cent Solution; and as Little John in the 1976 Richard Lester film Robin and Marian. Additionally, he portrayed an MI6 bureaucrat in The Human Factor (1979) (adapted from a novel by Graham Greene); an alcoholic attorney in I'm Dancing as Fast as I Can (1982); a colonel in the Cincinnati Gestapo in the Neil Simon comedy The Cheap Detective; Lord Louis Mountbatten in Lord Mountbatten - The Last Viceroy (1985); the dual roles of Dr. Worley/The Nome King in Return To Oz (1985); Father Morning in The Exorcist III (1990); Badger in the 1996 movie adaptation of Kenneth Grahame's Wind in the Willows; and as Cogliostro in the 1997 movie adaptation of Todd McFarlane's comic book Spawn.

Williamson made a major contribution to the documentary John Osborne and the Gift of Friendship, recalling episodes from his long professional relationship with Osborne. Recorded excerpts of his award-winning stage performance in Inadmissible Evidence also feature in the video.

Williamson was known for throwing onset tantrums and onstage antics. During the Philadelphia tryout of Inadmissible Evidence, a play in which he delivered a performance that would win him a Tony Award nomination in 1965, he punched the equally mercurial producer David Merrick. In 1968, he apologised to the audience for his performance one night while playing Hamlet and then walked off the stage, announcing he was retiring. In the early 1970s, Williamson left The Dick Cavett Show prior to a scheduled appearance, leaving the host and guest Nora Ephron to fill the remaining time. In 1976, he slapped actor Jim Litten during the curtain call for the Broadway musical Rex. In 1991, he hit co-star Evan Handler on the backside with a sword during a Broadway performance of I Hate Hamlet.

Other work
Following a late-night chat show appearance in which he showcased his singing talents, Williamson released an album of songs in 1971 on the CBS label (S 64045). The album contained songs such as "Didn't We", "It's Impossible" and "Help Me Make It Through the Night".

In 1974, Williamson recorded an abridged reading of The Hobbit for Argo Records, authorisation for the abridgement having been provided by J.R.R. Tolkien's publisher. The recording was produced by Harley Usill. According to his official website, Williamson re-edited the original script himself, removing many occurrences of "he said", "she said", and so on, as he felt that an over-reliance on descriptive narrative would not give the desired effect; he performed each character in a distinctive voice.

In 1978, Williamson portrayed a murderous behaviour expert in the Columbo episode "How To Dial A Murder". His character was one of the few suspects who attempted to kill Columbo.

Personal life
In 1971, Williamson married actress Jill Townsend, who had played his daughter in the Broadway production of Inadmissible Evidence. They had a son, Luke, but divorced in 1977.

Despite concerns over his health in the 1970s, Williamson admitted drinking heavily and claimed to smoke 80 cigarettes a day. In an episode of The David Frost Show in the 1960s, during a discussion about death, which also involved poet John Betjeman, Williamson revealed that he was very much afraid of dying, saying that "I think of death constantly, throughout the day" and that "I don't think there is anything after this, except complete oblivion."

Death
Williamson died on 16 December 2011, aged 75, two years after being diagnosed with esophageal cancer. In accord with Williamson's wish the news of his death was released a month later, as he did not want a fuss made over his death.

Filmography

Film

Television

Stage

Awards
Nicol Williamson was nominated for three BAFTA Awards, a Saturn Award, two Tony Awards, and won the Silver Shell for the Best Actor from the San Sebastián International Film Festival in 1969 for his performance in Laughter in the Dark.

BAFTA Awards

|-
| 1969
| The Bofors Gun
| Best Actor in a Leading Role
| 
|-
| 1970
| Inadmissible Evidence
| Best Actor in a Leading Role
| 
|-
| 1973
| The Gangster Show: The Resistible Rise of Arturo Ui
| Television Award for Best Actor
|

Drama Desk Awards

|-
| 1969
| Hamlet
| Outstanding Performance
| 
|-
| 1974
| Uncle Vanya
| Outstanding Performance
| 
|-
| 1976
| Rex
| Outstanding Actor in a Musical
|

Saturn Awards

|-
| 1982
| Excalibur
| Best Supporting Actor
|

Tony Awards

|-
| 1966
| Inadmissible Evidence
| Best Actor in a Play
| 
|-
| 1974
| Uncle Vanya
| Best Actor in a Play
|

References

Further reading
Dowsing, Martin. Beware of the Actor! The Rise and Fall of Nicol Williamson. Createspace / Testudines, 2017. 
Hershman, Gabriel. Black Sheep – The Authorised Biography of Nicol Williamson. The History Press, 2018.

External links
 
 
 
 
 Obituary, The Independent, 26 January 2012
 Obituary, The Guardian, 26 January 2012
 Obituary, Financial Times, 27 January 2012
 Reading Samuel Beckett

1936 births
2011 deaths
20th-century Scottish male actors
Alumni of Birmingham School of Acting
Deaths from cancer in the Netherlands
Deaths from esophageal cancer
Drama Desk Award winners
Male actors from Birmingham, West Midlands
People from Hamilton, South Lanarkshire
Scottish male film actors
Scottish male stage actors
Scottish male television actors
Anglo-Scots